Áine Carroll may refer to:

Áine Carroll, contestant in The Voice UK (series 5)
Dr. Áine Carroll, of Health Service Executive (Ireland)